×

Members of the New South Wales Legislative Assembly who served in the 37th  parliament held their seats from 1953 to 1956. They were elected at the 1953 state election, and at by-elections. The Speaker was Bill Lamb.

See also
Second Cahill ministry
Results of the 1953 New South Wales state election
Candidates of the 1953 New South Wales state election

References

Members of New South Wales parliaments by term
20th-century Australian politicians